Jebero (Chebero, Xebero, Xihuila) is a moribund Amazonian language spoken by the Jebero people of Jeberos, Peru. It is spoken by only a small number of older adults and belongs to the Cahuapanan family together with Chayahuita.

Phonology

Vowels

  varies between close front unrounded , near-close front unrounded  and close-mid front unrounded .
  varies between near-close near-front rounded  and close-mid back weakly rounded , with the latter realization being the most usual.
  varies between mid near-front unrounded  and close-mid central unrounded .
  is shorter than the other vowels, particularly between voiceless consonants.
 The sequence  is sometimes realized as a syllabic .
  varies between open central unrounded  and near-open retracted front . The vowel chart in  puts  in the near-open central position .
 In closed syllables,  is realized as open-mid central unrounded .

Consonants

  are bilabial, whereas  is labialized velar.
  is an affricate, rather than a plosive. It has nevertheless been placed in the table in that manner to save space.
  are laminal denti-alveolar .
 In the syllable coda,  is realized with a wider contact, maximally dentoalveolo-velar .
 After , the denti-alveolar contact is often not made, which makes  sound more like a velar nasal .
  may sometimes sound as if it were a lateral consonant, but it is never realized as lateral.
  are dentoalveolo-palatal .
  is sometimes realized as a weak fricative .
  occurs only in the affirmative interjection .
  is realized as a flap  in the syllable onset and as a trill  in the syllable coda.
  is a glottalized flap . Intervocalically, it is realized as a sequence .

References

Bibliography

 

Languages of Peru
Endangered indigenous languages of the Americas
Cahuapanan languages